Napoleon Whiting (September 21, 1910, Mississippi – October 22, 1984, Los Angeles, California), was an American character actor.

He played many bit parts, often uncredited, as a menial worker such as the African American butler, a stereotypical role. He also appeared as the butler in Giant (1956).

Whiting was best known to television audiences for his work as Silas on The Big Valley, a typecast but highly visible role.

Filmography

References

External links
 
 

1910 births
1984 deaths
African-American male actors
American male film actors
American male television actors
Male actors from Mississippi
20th-century American male actors
20th-century African-American people
Western (genre) television actors